The Gare de Longuerue-Vieux-Manoir (Longuerue-Vieux-Manoir station) is a railway station in the commune of Vieux-Manoir in the Seine-Maritime department, France, near Longuerue. The station is served by TER Normandie and TER Hauts-de-France trains from Amiens to Rouen.

References

Railway stations in Seine-Maritime